Crystal City station is a commuter rail station in the Crystal City section of Arlington, Virginia, located near the George Washington Memorial Parkway and Ronald Reagan National Airport. It is served by the Fredericksburg Line and Manassas Line of the Virginia Railway Express system. VRE plans to rebuild the station nearby to accommodate longer trains and increased service.

Planned rebuild

The station has a single side platform located on the west side of the three tracks of the RF&P Subdivision. Crystal City station, used by 18% of VRE riders in 2017, represents an "operational bottleneck" for VRE: the single -long platform is shorter than  trains and forces all trains to use one track.

VRE plans to expand the station into a full-length center platform serving two tracks, with grade-separated access to the platform. An alternatives analysis released in November 2017 analyzed three possible sites. All three sites would allow for a future pedestrian bridge or tunnel to Ronald Reagan National Airport to give direct airport access from the station and Crystal City. The preferred location was slightly south of the current station, with the platform stretching from 18th Street to south of 20th Street.

Preliminary engineering for the station began in late 2019. , final design was expected to last from January 2021 to August 2022, with construction from November 2022 to October 2024. In May 2022, Amtrak and the Virginia Passenger Rail Authority reached an agreement to add a separate Amtrak platform at the station. The station will be constructed with a single -long island platform with a low-level section for VRE and a high-level section for Amtrak.

References

External links

VRE - Crystal City
Crystal City Station Improvements

Crystal City, Arlington, Virginia
Crystal City
Railway stations in the United States opened in 1992
1992 establishments in Virginia
Buildings and structures in Arlington, Virginia
Transportation in Arlington County, Virginia